The 100 Greatest TV Ads is a British TV entertainment programme that first aired on 29 April 2000 on Channel 4. It is part of the channel's 100 Greatest strand of programmes, and was presented by Graham Norton.

The programme counted down the 100 greatest ever television adverts shown on British television since the launch of commercial broadcasting in 1955. A public poll was conducted on both the Channel 4 website and The Sunday Times newspaper to determine the outcome of the result. 

In addition to the programme showing the top 100 adverts, it also featured contributions from special guests and those who worked behind the scenes on the adverts. There were also two feature contributions in the programme, one from Peter Kay looking at some of the most obscure adverts in history, and the other showcased some classic international adverts with Gail Porter.

Top 100

Great Ads of the 21st Century
Since its original broadcast, the programme has been repeated numerous times on both Channel 4 and E4. On its first two reruns — in both 2003 and 2004 — additional inserts were added that showed some adverts that were not part of the original vote in 2000. These were, in order of appearance:

Reebok - Belly's Gonna Get You
John West Foods - Bear Fight (not included in the 2004 re-run)
Adidas - David Beckham & Jonny Wilkinson (only included in the 2004 re-run)
Metz - Judderman
Bacardi Breezer - Tomcat
John Smith's - Diving
Monster.co.uk - Beware Of The Voices (not included in the 2004 re-run)
Lynx Pulse - Make Luv (only included in the 2004 re-run)
Microsoft Xbox - Life Is Short, Play More

See also
100 Greatest (TV series)

References

2000s British television series
British television specials
Channel 4 original programming
English-language television shows
Top television lists
British television-related lists
Channel 4 documentary series